Villa Tunari or Tunari is a location in the department of Cochabamba, Bolivia.  It is the seat of the Villa Tunari Municipality, the third municipal section of the Chapare Province. According to the census 2012 the population was 3,213 in the town which is an increment from 2,510 registered during the 2001 census.

Villa Tunari has several parks located nearby including Parque Machía and Carrasco National Park.  Parque Machía is home to one of three wildlife centers maintained by Comunidad Inti Wara Yassi and supported by international volunteers. Villa Tunari is famous among tourists due to the tropical weather and due to nearby national parks. Recently the town gained important infrastructure due to the tourist industry and because a new paper industry seated near to the town.

Population 
The population increased moderately from 2001 census because little rural communities were settled near to the town. Most of people are quechua descent and the main spoken languages are Spanish and Quechua.

Geography 

Villa Tunari - about 160km to the northeast of Cochabamba - is located at the final folds of the Andean foothills of central Bolivia, a transition zone where steep orographies meet the extensive llanos region of Bolivia - itself a mosaic of savanna, rainforest, and monsoonal landscapes. The general vicinity of Villa Tunari is predominantly tropical rainforest, of the Southwestern Amazonian variety. Precipitation in this region is plentiful, with some of the highest annual rainfall trends in the country. Villa Tunari is a popular tourist destination thanks to its dramatic proximity to the central Andes, and its rich ecological surroundings.
Under the Köppen climate classification, Villa Tunari has a tropical rainforest climate with a lengthy rainy season, a shorter dry season and ample precipitation throughout the year. Villa Tunari experiences the highest recorded annual precipitation in Bolivia, and frequently exceeds 5,000mm of precipitation per year.

Sports 

The Estadio Olímpico Bicentenario de Villa Tunari is located in Villa Tunari. The 25,000-capacity stadium is used for football matches. It opened on 8 September 2018.

See also 
Comunidad Inti Wara Yassi
Tunari National Park
UMOPAR
Villa Tunari Massacre
Villa Tunari – San Ignacio de Moxos Highway

References

External links

.

Populated places in Cochabamba Department
Villa Tunari